A list of notable electroacoustic music and acousmatic composers:

__notoc__

A

B

C-F

G-H

I-J

K-L

M

N-Q

R-S

T-U

V-Z

Acousmatic